Methafurylene is an antihistamine and anticholinergic.

See also 

 Methaphenilene
 Methapyrilene

References 

2-Furyl compounds
Aminopyridines
H1 receptor antagonists